WWF Hong Kong (WWF HK) is the independent branch of the World Wide Fund for Nature in Hong Kong. It was established in December 1981 as World Wildlife Fund Hong Kong.

Being a leading environmental organization in Hong Kong, WWF has teams working on key environmental issues,  with a priority on Oceans and marine protected area designation, for 30% of Hong Kong’s waters to be protected by 2030 and active engagement with business and business leadership around Green Cities & Environmental Finance , through the Our planet Our Business programme.

WWF has been managing the Mai Po nature reserve habitat and research programme since 1983 and as a lead EAAFP partner is providing grants to support the WWF Flyways initiative and protect coastal wetlands throughout the Flyways range from Myanmar to Siberia and working to train the next generation of wetland managers. WWF Hong Kong  is now upgrading the training and research facilities at Mai Po , to be completed in 2021-2022 and welcomes public visitors to the reserve and other locations with eco visits and arrangement of permits by booking online at wwf.org.hk/en/.

The WWF Hong Kong team is now leading a key initiative Across 24 Asian offices to close Asia’s Illegal Wildlife markets and stop the trade into and around Asia of species that have no place being traded.

WWF Hong Kong has over 150 full-time staff for conservation impact and a new deal for nature and people. Visitors are welcome at some five centres located Central 1, Tramway path , Island House Tai Po, Mai Po, and Hoi Ha Wan.

The WWF Hong Kong team are also leading a two year global initiative in Education programmes , engaging youth with Connect with the nature platform , bringing educational resources to the professional teaching community and in interacting with schools in Hong Kong in the City Nature Challenge and in experiential learning visits to WWF outdoor centres at Hoi Har marine park , Island House Tai Po and Mai Po nature reserve. The online panda e academy has been launched in March 2020 in co-operation with the Hong Kong Institute of Education.

In the city visitors can interact and participate in activities at the sustainability hub at 1, Tramway Path At Mai Po nature reserve visitors can meet the WWF Hong Kong research team under Dr Carmen Or who is carrying out citizen science activities and biodiversity research across Hong Kong, such as the Camera trap mammal and firefly surveys to map more than 2050+ species across the Mai Po Marshes nature reserve. The surveys have also incorporated citizen science participation, and using this approach to further monitor biodiversity across Hong Kong, WWF have incorporated iNaturalist and the City Nature Challenge into activities at their Mai Po and Hoi Ha Wan centres. Other Citizen Science activities they’ve helped coordinate  in Hong Kong include the ecological survey and impact of clam dogging in Shui Hau Lantau and looking at the need for a no take zone and protection for the horseshoe crab breeding on the mudflats. The no plastics in nature campaign and coastal clean-up and surveying of marine litter programme called Coastal Watch has now evolved to looking at the impact of Ghost Gear abandoned by fishermen and arranging to remove and recycle these plastic nets

References

External links

Environmental organisations based in Hong Kong
Hong Kong